Håkon Didriksen (born 2 February 1974), known professionally as Memnock, is a Norwegian bassist best known for playing in the extreme metal band Susperia. He has been playing bass since early 1990 and started with a cheap Cort. He then bought a Rickenbacker 4001 ATM(L) and had this for many years as his favorite instrument. He lives in the small village of Kviteseid.

Discography

Metadox 1992–1995 
1992 Demo/Sample CD
1993 Demo
1994 Demo

Power Hunt 1996–1997 
Releases: 1 CD

Vanaheim 1997–1999 
En Historie (1997)
Helter og Kongers Fall (1998)

Abyssic Dreams 1998 
Releases: EP "Dark Angel"
A Winters Tale (2016) LP
High the Memory (2019) LP

Old Man's Child 1999 
Releases: CD "Revelation 666 – The Curse of Damnation"

Susperia 1999+ 
1999 Demo "Illusions of Evil"
2001 CD "Predominance"
2002 CD "Vindication"
2004 CD "Unlimited"
2005 EP "Devil May Care"
2007 CD "Cut from Stone"
2009 CD "Attitude"
2011 CD "We Are the ones"

1974 births
Living people
Norwegian heavy metal bass guitarists
Norwegian male bass guitarists
Norwegian black metal musicians
Norwegian rock bass guitarists
People from Kviteseid
21st-century Norwegian bass guitarists
21st-century Norwegian male musicians
Susperia members